The 1961–62 Northern Rugby Football League season was the 67th season of rugby league football.

Season summary
Huddersfield won their seventh Championship when they beat Wakefield Trinity 14-5 in the play-off final.

The Challenge Cup winners were Wakefield Trinity who beat Huddersfield 12-6 in the final.

At the end of this season the league was split into two divisions. The top 16 in the league formed Division 1 and the bottom 14 formed Division 2.

Wigan won the Lancashire League, and Wakefield Trinity won the Yorkshire League. St. Helens beat Swinton 25–9 to win the Lancashire County Cup, and Wakefield Trinity beat Leeds 19–9 to win the Yorkshire County Cup.

Championship

Play-offs

Challenge Cup

Wakefield Trinity beat Huddersfield 12-6 in the Challenge Cup Final played at Wembley Stadium before a crowd of 81,263.
This was Wakefield Trinity’s third Challenge Cup Final win in four Final appearances. Neil Fox, their centre, was awarded the Lance Todd Trophy for his man-of-the-match performance. This has been the only time in a Rugby League Challenge Cup Final that a place kick has not been converted. Fox dropped three goals for Wakefield Trinity, then worth two points each.

References

Sources
1961-62 Rugby Football League season at wigan.rlfans.com
The Challenge Cup at The Rugby Football League website

1961 in English rugby league
1962 in English rugby league
Northern Rugby Football League seasons